Agni Yudham is a 1981 Indian Malayalam film, directed by N. P. Suresh and produced by Purushan Alappuzha. The film stars Jayabharathi, Jagathy Sreekumar, Jose Prakash and Sukumaran in the lead roles. The film has musical score by A. T. Ummer.

Cast
Jayabharathi
Jagathy Sreekumar
Jose Prakash
Sukumaran
M. G. Soman

References

External links
 

1981 films
1980s Malayalam-language films
Films directed by N. P. Suresh